Cormont or de Cormont is a surname. Notable people with the surname include: 

Ethan Cormont (born 2000), French athlete
Renaud de Cormont, French Gothic Era master-mason and architect 
Thomas de Cormont, French Gothic Era master-mason and architect, father of Renaud 

French-language surnames